Isabel Garcia is a fashion brand founded in 2009 and based in Bologna, Italy.

History
The Gold Label collection debuted at London Fashion Week in September 2014,  which took place at Freemasons' Hall. The 17-18 collection presented dresses made of soft velvet sequins, elastic textured fabrics, graphic ornaments and color blocks are presented in this collection.

Colors
Emerald green and bluish-coniferous hues, arctic blue, terracotta, purple, silver, shades of peach and pink are the main colors of the collection.

Description
Isabel Garcia develops two fashion lines in clothing and accessories:

 Gold Label: Clothes made of expensive fabrics
 Isabel Garcia: Elegant attires for prominent events

As of November 2014, the company had approximately 200 employees.

References

External links
Official Website
Aztec Zone Site

Clothing brands of Italy
Online clothing retailers of Italy